Hana or HANA may refer to:

Places

Europe
 Haná, an ethnic region in Moravia, Czech Republic
 Traianoupoli, Greece, called Hana during the Ottoman period
 Hana, Norway, a borough in the city of Sandnes, Norway

West Asia
 Hana, Iran, a city in Isfahan Province, Iran
 Hana, Fars, a village in Fars Province, Iran
 Hana, Kerman, a village in Kerman Province, Iran
 Hana Rural District (disambiguation), in Iran

Pacific
 Hana, Hawaii, a census-designated place in Maui County, Hawaiʻi, USA
Hana Highway, long and winding road connecting Hana, Hawaiʻi to the rest of the island of Maui

Africa
 Hana, Ethiopia, a town in the woredas of Selamago in Ethiopia

People 
 Hana (name), a given name and list of people with the name
 Ben Hana (1957–2012), New Zealand activist
 Marion Tait, British ballerina

Music

Musicians
 Hana (American musician), stage name of American singer-songwriter and producer Hana Pestle
 Hana (South Korean singer), South Korean singer, songwriter and actress
 Hana Kuk, a Chinese singer-songwriter known mononymously as HANA

Albums
 Hana (Supernova album), a 2009 Korean K-pop album
 Hana, an album by Sonim

Songs
 "Hana" (Mémento Mori), a 1996 song by Mr. Children
 "Hana" (Orange Range song) (花), a song by Orange Range
  (花), Japanese song by jealkb
  (花), Japanese song by Kousuke Atari
  (花), Japanese song by Oyunaa
  (花), Japanese song by Mariko Kouda
 "Hana", a 2007 song by Joni Mitchell from Shine
 "Hana"(Rentarō Taki)(花),a song by Rentarō Taki

Acronyms 
 High-Definition Audio-Video Network Alliance, a disbanded organization supporting IEEE 1394 applications
 SAP HANA, a column-oriented, in-memory database appliance from SAP SE

Other uses 
 Hana (film), a 2006 Japanese black comedy by Hirokazu Koreeda
 Hana Financial Group, a South Korean holding company
 Hana, a character in Kamen Rider Den-O
 The transliterated Korean name for the number "1"
 Hana, a flexible office space subsidiary of CBRE
 Hana, a brand name of desogestrel

See also 
 Hannah (disambiguation)